No Country for Young Men is a 2017 Italian comedy film directed by Giovanni Veronesi.

Cast

References

External links

2017 films
Films directed by Giovanni Veronesi
2010s Italian-language films
2017 comedy films
Italian comedy films
2010s Italian films